Ahmad Baba is a crater on Mercury. It has a diameter of 127 kilometers. Its name was adopted by the International Astronomical Union (IAU) in 1979.

Ahmad Baba is one of 110 peak ring basins on Mercury.  Hollows are present within the crater.

References

Impact craters on Mercury